The Jayewardene family  is a Sri Lankan family that is prominent in law and politics. Along with many members who have been successful politician across generations, the family includes President and Prime Ministers of Sri Lanka.

Family Tree
 Tombi Mudaliyar Don Adrian Wijesinghe Jayewardene (1768–1830) A descendant of a Colombo Chetty originally from Coromandel Coast of India who married into a Sinhalese family called Jayewardene; conspired with the British to overthrow the last King of Kandy
Mudaliyar Don Abraham Wijesinghe Jayewardene (1801–1866)
 James Alfred Jayewardene (c. 1845 – 1888), Deputy Coroner of Colombo + Cornelia Matilda Wijekoon
Hector Alfred Jayewardene, (1870 - 1913), member of the Colombo Municipal Council
 Colonel T. G. Jayewardene (1872–1945), Member of State Council + Lena Attygalle
 Major T. F. Jayewardene, Member of Parliament 
 Justice Eugene Wilfred Jayewardene, KC (1874–1932), Chief Justice + Agnes Helen Don Philip Wijewardene
J. R. Jayewardene (1906–1996), President of Sri Lanka, Prime Minister of Sri Lanka, Government Minister, Member of Parliament, Member of State Council
 Captain Ravi Jayewardene (1936 - 2017), National Security Adviser
 Hector Wilfred Jayewardene, QC (1916–1990), Member at the United Nations Commission on Human Rights
John Adrian St. Valentine Jayewardene (1877 – 1927), Judge of the Supreme Court of Ceylon
 Clodagh Jayasuriya, Member of Parliament

Other members of the family include;
 F. R. Senanayake
 Sir John Lionel Kotelawala
 Richard Gotabhaya Senanayake
 Ranil Wickremesinghe

See also
List of political families in Sri Lanka

References